Sir George Bowen (1821–1899) was a British colonial administrator.

George Bowen may also refer to:

 George Bowen (colonial settler) (1803–1889), military officer and settler of New South Wales

George Bowen (footballer) (1875–1945), English soccer player
George Bowen (missionary) (1816–1888), American missionary in India
George Bowen (New York politician) (1831–1921), New York politician
George Bowen (rugby union) (1863–1919), Welsh international rugby union half back
George Bevan Bowen (1858–1940), Welsh Conservative landowner and county officer in Pembrokeshire

See also
Edward George Bowen (1911–1991), British physicist
Michael George Bowen (1930–2019), English prelate of the Roman Catholic Church